Proncey David Robertson is an American politician from the state of Alabama. He currently serves as a member of the Alabama House of Representatives for District 7. He is part of the Republican Party.

Career 
Robertson was a Sergeant in the United States Air Force from 1986 to 1990. After retiring from the Air Force, he began a career in the police force, becoming an officer with the Russellville Police Department in Russellville, Arkansas. After 4 years in Russellville, Robertson moved to Decatur, Alabama, becoming a Lieutenant in the local police force. He worked in the force for 24 years before running for state office. During his time with the Decatur Police, Robertson won the 2003 American Legion's "Alabama Law Enforcement Officer of the Year" award. Robertson also served as the Lawrence County Republican Party executive committee chairman from 2014 to 2018. Robertson announced his candidacy for State office in 2017. Robertson retired from the Decatur Police to run for State Representative in 2018, winning the Republican primary election unopposed, and defeating his Democratic opponent, Kenneth Brackins, with 75.2% of the vote.

Committee Positions 
Robertson is a member of Education Policy, Public Safety and Homeland Security, and Boards Agencies and Commissions Committees.

Elections

Alabama House of Representatives District 7

References 

Republican Party members of the Alabama House of Representatives
Living people
21st-century American politicians
1968 births